The 2007–08 UEFA Champions League was the 16th season of UEFA's premier European club football tournament, the UEFA Champions League, since it was rebranded in 1992, and the 53rd tournament overall.

The final was played on 21 May 2008 at the Luzhniki Stadium in Moscow, where Manchester United played against Chelsea, making it an all-English final for the first time in the history of the European Cup. Manchester United won the match 6–5 on penalties, following a 1–1 draw after extra time.

Milan were the defending champions, but were eliminated by Arsenal in the first knockout round.

Qualification
76 teams participated in the 2007–08 UEFA Champions League from 52 UEFA member associations (not including Liechtenstein). Each association enters a certain number of clubs to the Champions League based on its league coefficient which takes into account the performance of its clubs in European competitions from 2001–02 to 2005–06.; associations with a higher league coefficients may enter more clubs than associations with a lower league coefficient, but no association may enter more than four teams. All UEFA associations are guaranteed to have at least one team qualify, with the exception of Liechtenstein, which competes in the Swiss league system, but has no team in the Swiss Super League. One new nation entered their league champion in this year's tournament: Montenegro, following the dissolution of Serbia and Montenegro. The champions from San Marino and Andorra also entered from this year onwards. Below is the qualification scheme for the 2007–08 Champions League:

Associations 1–3 each have four teams qualify.
Associations 4–6 each have three teams qualify.
Associations 7–15 each have two teams qualify.
Associations 16–53 (except Liechtenstein) each have one team qualify.

Association ranking
For the 2007–08 UEFA Champions League, the associations are allocated places according to their 2006 UEFA country coefficients, which takes into account their performance in European competitions from 2001–02 to 2005–06.

Distribution
Since the title holders (Milan) qualified for the Champions League third qualifying round through their domestic league and entered the group stage automatically, their spot in the third qualifying round is vacated, and the following changes to the default access list are made:
The champions of association 16 (Switzerland) are promoted from the second qualifying round to the third qualifying round.
The champions of associations 23 and 24 (Denmark and Hungary) are promoted from the first qualifying round to the second qualifying round.

Teams

Notes

Round and draw dates
The calendar shows the dates of the rounds and draw.

1 Group D teams played their Matchday 6 fixtures on 4 December due to Milan's participation in the 2007 FIFA Club World Cup in Japan on 13 and 16 December.

2 As both Milan and Internazionale use the Stadio San Siro as their home pitch, and both were scheduled to play at home for the second leg of the first knockout round, Internazionale's home leg against Liverpool was postponed by one week to 11 March 2008.

Qualifying rounds

First qualifying round
The draw was held on Friday, 29 June 2007 in Nyon, Switzerland. The draw was conducted by UEFA General Secretary David Taylor and Michele Centenaro, UEFA's head of club competitions. The first leg matches were held on 17 July and 18 July, while the second legs were played on 24 July and 25 July 2007.

|}

Second qualifying round
The draw was held on Friday, 29 June 2007 in Nyon, Switzerland. The draw was conducted by UEFA General Secretary David Taylor and Michele Centenaro, UEFA's head of club competitions. The first leg matches were played on 31 July and 1 August, while the second legs were played on 7 August and 8 August 2007.

|}

Third qualifying round
The draw was held on Friday, 3 August 2007 in Nyon, Switzerland. The draw was conducted by UEFA General Secretary David Taylor and Giorgio Marchetti, UEFA's director of professional football. The first leg matches were played on 14 August and 15 August, while the second legs were played on 28 August and 29 August 2007. Winners in this round qualified for the group stage, while the losing clubs entered the first round of the UEFA Cup. Due to the death of Antonio Puerta, the second leg of Sevilla's game against AEK Athens was postponed until 3 September.

|}

Group stage

The draw was held on Thursday, 30 August 2007 at the Grimaldi Forum in Monaco. The draw was hosted by Pedro Pinto and conducted by UEFA General Secretary David Taylor and Michele Centenaro, UEFA's head of club competitions. The matches were played between 18 September and 12 December 2007.

The top two teams in each group advanced to the knockout stage, and the third-placed teams entered the round of 32 of the UEFA Cup. Based on paragraph 6.05 in the UEFA regulations for the current season, if two or more teams are equal on points on completion of the group matches, the following criteria are applied to determine the rankings:
higher number of points obtained in the group matches played among the teams in question;
superior goal difference from the group matches played among the teams in question;
higher number of goals scored away from home in the group matches played among the teams in question;
superior goal difference from all group matches played;
higher number of goals scored in all group matches played;
higher number of coefficient points accumulated by the club in question, as well as its association, over the previous five seasons.

Sevilla and Slavia Prague made their debut appearance in the group stage.

In results tables, the home team is listed in the left-hand column.

Group A

Group B

Group C

Group D

Group E

Group F

Group G

Group H

Knockout stage

From the last 16 through to the semi-finals, clubs play two matches against each other on a home and away basis with the same rules as the qualifying rounds applied. In the last 16, group winners play runners-up other than teams from their own pool or nation.

The draw for the first knockout round was held on Friday, 21 December 2007 in Nyon, Switzerland. The draw was conducted by UEFA General Secretary David Taylor and Giorgio Marchetti, UEFA's director of professional football.

The draws for the quarter-finals and semi-finals were both held on Friday, 14 March 2008 in Nyon, Switzerland. The draw was conducted by UEFA General Secretary David Taylor and Rinat Dasayev, the ambassador for the final in Moscow. Unlike the first knockout round, teams from the same group or country may be drawn together from the quarter-finals onwards.

Bracket

Round of 16
The first leg matches were played on 19 February and 20 February, while the second legs were played on 4 March and 5 March 2008. Due to a stadium clash with Milan, the second leg of Internazionale's game against Liverpool was held on 11 March.

|}

Quarter-finals
The first leg matches were played on 1 April and 2 April, while the second leg matches were played on 8 April and 9 April 2008.

|}

Semi-finals
The first leg matches were played on 22 April and 23 April, while the second leg matches were played on 29 April and 30 April 2008.

|}

Final

The 2008 UEFA Champions League Final was played on 21 May 2008 at the Luzhniki Stadium in Moscow, Russia. The final was contested by Manchester United and Chelsea, representing the first time the final had been contested by two teams from England.

United won the match 6–5 on penalties after the game had ended in a 1–1 draw. Cristiano Ronaldo had given the eventual victors the lead after 26 minutes, only for Frank Lampard to equalise immediately before half-time. Ryan Giggs came on as a substitute late in the second half to make his 759th appearance for Manchester United, a new club record. Early in extra time, Giggs had a shot cleared off the Chelsea goal-line by John Terry, whilst Chelsea twice hit the Manchester United woodwork. A melée involving most of the 22 players ensued midway through the second half of extra time, with Didier Drogba being sent off for a slap on Nemanja Vidić right in front of the referee.

The scores level at full-time, the match went to penalties. Chelsea took the upper hand in the third round of the shoot-out as Cristiano Ronaldo's penalty was saved by Petr Čech, handing John Terry the chance to win the cup with Chelsea's fifth penalty. However, Chelsea's captain lost his footing as he went to kick the ball, and his shot hit the post. Ryan Giggs stepped up for United's seventh penalty, and scored, before Edwin van der Sar saved the following kick from Nicolas Anelka to crown Manchester United as the champions of Europe for the third time.

As winners of the competition, Manchester United went on to represent Europe at the 2008 FIFA Club World Cup.

Statistics
Statistics exclude qualifying rounds.

Top goalscorers

Source: UEFA Champions League Press Release - Top Scorers - Final - Wednesday 21 May 2008 (after match)

Top assists

Source:

See also
2007–08 UEFA Cup
2007 UEFA Intertoto Cup
2008 UEFA Super Cup
2008 FIFA Club World Cup
2007–08 UEFA Women's Cup

References

External links

2007–08 All matches – season at UEFA website
Champions League at uefa.com
All scorers 2007–08 UEFA Champions League (excluding qualifying round) according to protocols UEFA + all scorers qualifying round
2007/08 UEFA Champions League - results and line-ups (archive)

 
1
UEFA Champions League seasons